The LSU Tigers golf team represents the Louisiana State University in the sport of golf.  The Tigers compete in Division I of the National Collegiate Athletic Association (NCAA) and the Southeastern Conference (SEC). They play their home matches on the University Club of Baton Rouge in Baton Rouge, Louisiana and are currently coached by Chuck Winstead. The LSU Tigers golf program has won five NCAA national tournament championships and sixteen SEC championships.

Team honors
The LSU Tigers golf program begun competition in 1932. The Tigers have won five NCAA tournament national championships in 1940 (co-champion with Princeton), 1942 (co-champion with Stanford), 1947, 1955 and 2015.  

The Tigers have won sixteen SEC conference championships in 1937, 1938, 1939, 1940, 1942, 1946, 1947, 1948, 1953, 1954, 1960, 1966, 1967, 1986, 1987 and 2015.

Individual honors
Three LSU Tigers have won three NCAA individual national championships. They are Fred Haas (1937), Earl Stewart (1941) and John Peterson (2011). 

Thirteen LSU Tigers have won eighteen SEC individual titles. They are Fred Haas (1937), Henry Castillo (1939, 39, 40), Earl Stewart (1941), Joe Moore (1947), Eddie Merrins (1953, 54), Don Essig (1960), Howard Fraser (1961), B.R. McLendon (1965, 66, 67), Vaughn Moise (1969), Wayne DeFrancesco (1979), John Salamon (1981), Emlyn Aubrey (1984) and David Toms (1987)

Notable players
Brian Bateman, 1 career PGA tour victory
Gardner Dickinson, 7 career PGA tour victories
Fred Haas, 5 career PGA tour victories
Jay Hebert, winner of 1960 PGA Championship, 7 career PGA tour victories
Smylie Kaufman, 1 career PGA tour victory
Mac McLendon, 4 career PGA tour victories
Johnny Pott, 5 career PGA tour victories
Earl Stewart, 3 career PGA tour victories
David Toms, winner of 2001 PGA Championship, 2018 U.S. Senior Open, 13 career PGA tour victories

Coaching staff 
Chuck Winstead is the head coach of the LSU Tigers golf team. He has been head coach since 2006. He was also a member of the LSU golf team from 1989-1991.

Facilities

University Club of Baton Rouge
The University Club of Baton Rouge in Baton Rouge, Louisiana, is the home of the LSU Tigers and LSU Lady Tigers golf teams and serves as the host site for all of LSU's tournaments. The University Club is a private facility that was built to be the permanent home of LSU Golf. It has a 7,700 yard, par-72 championship-caliber, 300-acre course.

Mary and Woody Bilyeu Golf Practice Facility

The Mary and Woody Bilyeu Golf Practice Facility functions as the golf-learning center for the LSU Tigers and Lady Tigers golf teams. The clubhouse lobby and team meeting room showcases the history of both the men’s and women’s golf programs at LSU. The facility also contains locker rooms for the men's and women's teams and an office for each coach. The practice facility features a 100-yard-long tee box and 10,000-square-foot putting green with bunkers around it.

See also
LSU Tigers and Lady Tigers

References

External links 
Official website

 
Sports clubs established in 1932
1932 establishments in Louisiana